Elections to Newham London Borough Council were held on 2 May 2002. The whole council was up for election. Turnout was 25.49%. Labour won all but one seat. The sole opposition councillor was Alan Craig of the Christian Peoples Alliance.

Election result

|}

Background
A total of 144 candidates stood in the election for the 60 seats being contested across 20 wards. Candidates included a full slate from the Labour Party (as had been the case at every election since the borough council had been formed in 1964), whilst the Conservative Party ran 31 candidates and the Liberal Democrats ran 7 candidates. Other candidates running were 14 Greens, 9 Christian Peoples Alliance, 6 Newham Independents Association, 4 Socialist Alliance, 3 BNP, 1 Socialist Labour, 1 UKIP and 8 Independents.

Results by ward

Beckton

Boleyn

Canning Town North

Canning Town South

Custom House

East Ham Central

East Ham North

East Ham South

Forest Gate North

Forest Gate South

Green Street East

Green Street West

Little Ilford

Manor Park

Plaistow North

Plaistow South

Royal Docks

Stratford and New Town

Wall End

West Ham

By-elections between 2002 and 2006
There were no by-elections.

References

2002
2002 London Borough council elections